The Oval, currently referred to for sponsorship purposes as the Kia Oval, is an international cricket ground in Kennington, in the London Borough of Lambeth, in south London. The Oval has been the home ground of Surrey County Cricket Club since it was opened in 1845. It was the first ground in England to host international Test cricket in September 1880. The final Test match of the English season is traditionally played there. The Oval has hosted Test, One Day International (ODI) and Twenty20 International cricket matches in both men's and women's cricket.

In cricket, a five-wicket haul (also known as a "five-for" or "fifer") refers to a bowler taking five or more wickets in a single innings, which is regarded as a notable achievement. The first bowler to take a five-wicket haul in a Test match at the Oval was Fred Morley in 1880 who finished with bowling figures of 5 wickets for 56 runs. In women's cricket, five bowlers have taken five-wicket hauls in Women's Tests, the first being England's Joan Davis who took 5 wickets for 31 runs against Australia in 1937.

The first bowler to take a five-wicket haul in an ODI on the ground was England's Mike Hendrick who took 5 wickets for 31 runs against Australia in 1980. Only one five-wicket haul has been taken in T20I cricket: Pakistan's Umar Gul's 5 wickets for 6 runs in 2009.

Key

Test match five-wicket hauls

A total of 152 Test match five-wicket hauls have been taken at the Oval, including five taken in Women's Tests.

Men's matches

Women's matches

One Day International five-wicket hauls

There have been ten bowlers who have taken five-wicket hauls in ODIs on the ground, all in men's matches.

Twenty20 Internationals

A single five-wicket haul has been taken in T20I matches on the ground.

Notes

References

External links
International five-wicket hauls at The Oval, CricInfo

 

The Oval
Oval